A referendum on the islands' status was held in the Federated States of Micronesia on 21 June 1983. Voters were asked two questions. The first was on whether they approved of the Compact of Free Association between the FSM and the United States. The second was what their preference was if Free Association was rejected. Voters were presented with the option of independence or an alternative which they had to fill in on the ballot form.

The first question was approved by 76.88% of voters, rendering the outcome of the second question (58.04% in favour of independence) moot.

Results

Compact of Free Association with the USA

Alternative status

References

1983 referendums
1983 in the Federated States of Micronesia
Referendums in the Federated States of Micronesia
Independence referendums